Greaney is a surname of Irish origin. Notable people with the name include:

 Alex Greaney (born 1975), British rowing cox
 Áine Greaney (born c. 1962), Irish writer and editor
 Con Greaney (21st century), Irish singer
 Dan Greaney (21st century), American television writer
 John Greaney (born 1939), American judge
 Mark Greaney (born 1980), Irish musician
 Patrick Greaney (fl. 18th century), Gaelic-Irish poet
 Susan Greaney, British archaeologist

See also
 Greany
 Greeney
 Greenie (disambiguation)

Surnames of Irish origin